Mil Pay Mil (also Romanized as Mīl Pāy Mīl; also known as Pā-ye Mīl) is a village in Seydun-e Jonubi Rural District, Seydun District, Bagh-e Malek County, Khuzestan Province, Iran. At the 2006 census, its population was 142, in 25 families.

References 

Populated places in Bagh-e Malek County